The 2018 San Diego State Aztecs baseball team represented San Diego State University in the 2018 NCAA Division I baseball season as a member of the Mountain West Conference. The team was coached by Mark Martinez and played their home games at Tony Gwynn Stadium.

Previous season

The Aztecs finished 42–21 overall, and 20–10 in the conference. During the season, the Aztecs were invited and participated in the Tony Gwynn Classic in San Diego, California. San Diego State defeated Notre Dame to earn 5th place. In the postseason, San Diego State defeated New Mexico in the semifinals and Fresno State twice in the quarterfinals and championship to earn 1st place in the 2017 Mountain West Conference baseball tournament in Albuquerque, New Mexico. The Aztecs were invited and participated in the 2017 NCAA Division I baseball tournament, where they defeated UCLA but lost to Long Beach State twice in the Long Beach Regional in Long Beach, California.

MLB draft selections

The Aztecs had five individuals selected in the 2017 MLB draft.

Roster

Schedule

References

San Diego State
San Diego State Aztecs baseball seasons
San Diego State
2018 NCAA Division I baseball tournament participants